Symphonic Source, Inc, founded in 2010, is an American developer and marketer of data cleansing and deduplication software for customer relationship management (CRM) systems and related databases.

The company sells  Software as a service (SaaS) tools that allow system administrators (example salesforce.com administrators) to search for and merge duplicate/similar records in their systems. Their tools all harness the power of cloud computing to perform complex and resource intensive operations in very small amounts of time.

A number of the founders of Symphonic Source were also founders and or early employees of Tek-Tools Software.

Products
 Cloudingo — a cloud-based SaaS, connects to salesforce.com and allows system administrators to scan their entire database for similar or duplicate records. Cloudingo was launched in late 2011. It is well known for its ease-of-use and rich user experience. Cloudingo was featured at the Dreamforce 2012 conference.

Free Tools
 DupeCatcher  a 100% native Force.com application that blocks/flags duplicate records at the time they are being entered. DupeCatcher was released in the fall of 2010 and quickly became one of the most popular free apps on the Salesforce AppExchange. Thousands of companies worldwide make use of DupeCatcher including many of the Fortune 1000.
 Cloudingo Studio  a Windows-based Force.com SOQL builder/explorer. Cloudingo Studio was released in the first quarter of 2013 as a free tool for the Salesforce.com developer community. It was designed to make it quicker and easier for traditional developers and DBAs (SQL Server, MySQL, Oracle) to quickly move over to the Force.com platform by giving them a familiar work-space. One of the major draws to Cloudingo Studio is its support for SOQL+. SOQL+ is a ported version of SQL that allows people who are used to SQL to perform similar operations in SOQL. An example of this would be "Select * from Accounts". Select * is not an option in traditional SOQL. Cloudingo Studio actually translates the statement into SOQL, and runs the query while also giving the user the actual SOQL query should they want to include it in Salesforce.com Apex code.

References

External links
 Official website

Software companies based in Texas
Customer relationship management software
Companies based in Dallas
System administration
Software companies of the United States